is a Japanese 3-D animated science fantasy action film based on the Yu-Gi-Oh! series. It was produced to celebrate the tenth anniversary of the NAS-produced series, Yu-Gi-Oh! Duel Monsters, and features the main characters from the original Yu-Gi-Oh! anime series, Yu-Gi-Oh! GX and Yu-Gi-Oh! 5D's.

It was released in Japanese theaters on January 23, 2010. An English-language version of the film was produced by 4Kids Entertainment. The digital cinema developer and distributor Cinedigm screened the film in selected stereoscopic 3D theaters in the United States. In the United Kingdom, Manga Entertainment released the film in selected stereoscopic 3D cinemas, and followed this with a Blu-ray 3D and DVD release. The film was also released in the United States on Blu-ray and DVD.

Film critics, however, criticized it for its limited scope of audience, claiming it was strictly marketed to children or fans of the series.

Plot 
As Yusei Fudo ponders the state of New Domino City, Jack Atlas and Crow Hogan cheer him up with the idea of riding on their Duel Runners. As they ride, a mysterious Turbo Duelist called Paradox challenges Yusei to a duel. Yusei summons his Stardust Dragon but Paradox seals it inside a card and disappears with it. They later discover an article that shows a mysterious battle in the past of Venice, Italy that Yusei knows did not happen in history before. Compounding the situation, New Domino City is vanishing. As a result, the Crimson Dragon appears, giving Yusei's Duel Runner the ability to travel through time.

In the past, Jaden Yuki is attacked by evil versions of stolen monster cards in Venice, Italy, including Stardust Dragon. As Paradox prepares to kill Jaden, Yusei and the Crimson Dragon arrive and protect him. Afterward, Paradox flees to an earlier point in time. Jaden tells Yusei that he was pursuing Paradox, who stole his friends' cards. Yusei explains to Jaden the situation, and they decide to work together. Jaden pulls out a computer and uses the Manjome foundation's database to pull up an article, which states that Paradox killed Pegasus, using Stardust and other famous dragons. Suddenly, Jaden's Neos card disappears like Stardust Dragon did, and this era starts to vanish as well. Yusei and Jaden travel back even further in time to try to prevent Pegasus's death. Years earlier, Maximillion Pegasus is hosting a duel tournament in Domino City, which Yugi Muto is attending with his maternal grandfather Solomon. Paradox uses his newly acquired monsters to attack the event, killing Pegasus, Yugi's grandfather, and several bystanders, but Yugi survives. Yusei and Jaden arrive, and the Crimson Dragon transports them and Yugi 30 minutes back in time before Paradox's attack, in order to stop him, as Pegasus' premature death would drastically alter the course of history. After learning about Paradox's actions, Yugi decides to join them by letting the Pharaoh take over. Jaden notices his Neos is back and proclaims that right now, all their cards are safe from being destroyed by any alteration already done to time.

The trio then confronts Paradox, who reveals that he comes from a dystopian future far beyond Yusei's in which the world lies in ruins and nothingness, and claims that the only way to fix it is to eliminate Duel Monsters from history. However, the three heroes protest that by doing so, all the future events and people associated with Duel Monsters will be erased as well, and they challenge him to a duel. By combining the powers of their key monsters, Yugi, Jaden and Yusei defeat Paradox. After the duel, the three say goodbye to each other and promise to meet again someday. The latter two return to their respective time periods. New Domino City returns to normal, and Yusei returns to his own time, optimistic for what the future holds.

Cast

Development and release
In July 2009, Yu-Gi-Oh! Bonds Beyond Time was first announced through Shueisha's magazines as a short film to be screened at the Jump Super Anime Tour to celebrate the tenth anniversary of the Yu-Gi-Oh! Duel Monsters anime series. It was revealed in the November issue of V-Jump magazine, that the animation would be a 3-D film. The film's imagery, however, was originally produced in 2D, and then was converted to 3D by the company Qtec. The 3D effect is emphasized in scenes where computer graphics are used, such as in the scene when the Duel Runners and the cards appear.

The film's official website released a 65-second trailer in September 2009, and a 139-second trailer in December. On January 21, 2010, before the film's release, a guidebook titled Yu-Gi-Oh! 10th Anniversary Animation Book was publisher under Shueisha's V Jump Books line. It contains an interview with Kazuki Takahashi—the author of the original Yu-Gi-Oh! manga—and information about the film's story and characters and was accompanied by a poster of the film. The film was released in Japan on January 23, 2010; those who attended the premiere receiving a promotional Malefic Red Eyes Black Dragon card. The film received an encore screening in Japan which was held on February 20, 2011, which included ten extra minutes in 2D. Bonds Beyond Time was released on DVD and Blu-ray Disc on June 15, 2011 by a partnership between King Records, Marvelous Entertainment, and Pony Canyon.

Staff
Members of the staff from the different Yu-Gi-Oh television series were involved in the film production. Shin Yoshida, the film's screenwriter, worked on Yu-Gi-Oh! Duel Monsters, Yu-Gi-Oh! GX, and Yu-Gi-Oh! 5D's. Masahiro Hikokubo did the composition of the duels for the film as he previously did for GX and 5D's. Kenichi Takeshita, the director of 5D's, went on directing Bonds Beyond Time. The same production companies for all the anime, Studio Gallop and Nihon Ad Systems, were involved in the film. The film's music was composed by Yutaka Minobe and the Wall 5 Project, both also responsible for 5D's songs. The main theme music of the film is "Makemagic" by Atsushi Tamura's band Jealkb.

English localization and release
During 4Kids Entertainment's quarterly conference call in March 2010, Chairman and Chief Executive Officer Alfred Khan said they are "participating in a brand new Yu-Gi-Oh! 3D movie," implying that 4Kids would produce an English-language version of the film for a Western release. A 20-minute preview for the English version of the film was shown at San Diego Comic Con 2010, and an American release date in early 2011 in select 3-D theaters was announced. The film's debut in the United States occurred at an event in New York on February 23, 2011. It included demonstrations of Konami's Yu-Gi-Oh! trading card game, the anime's voice actors, a costume contest, and benefited the Make-A-Wish Foundation of Metro New York.
	
Cinedigm showed the film in selected American stereoscopic 3D theaters on February 26 and 27, 2011, and on March 5 and 6, 2011. The version shown in the U.S. features a recap consisting of an additional 10 minutes of animation, compared to the original Japanese release. Manga Entertainment holds the license to distribute the film in the United Kingdom. It was released in selected stereoscopic 3D cinemas on May 14 and 21, 2011, and the viewers gained a rare card for each ticket bought. The film was released on Blu-ray 3D and DVD on July 25, 2011; the release contains the English language and original Japanese versions. On July 15, 2014, it was released by New Video Group in North America on Blu-ray.

Like the TV series, the movie is heavily edited and localized to be strictly aimed at elementary school aged children in Western countries.  The musical score is completely redone and all the sound effects are completely replaced with brand new American made sound effects and there are none of the original Japanese musical score and none of the original Japanese sound effects in the English dub, and the sound effects in the English dub of the movie that are thought to be the original Japanese sound effects are really the American sound effects created by 4Kids from the original Japanese sound effects or made to sound like the original Japanese sound effects in the English dub.  The cards are re-designed to the same format as the edited English dub of the TV series and any visible text that is in Japanese or English is erased or obscured due to FCC regulations like in the TV series's edited English dub.

Reception
Yu-Gi-Oh! It grossed $2,017,928 in Japanese theatres, making it the 125th-highest-grossing film released in Japan in 2010. The DVD and Blu-ray releases of the film reached number two in the best-selling lists of their respective media. In the first week, the DVD edition has sold 5,488 copies, while 4,653 copies of Blu-ray has been sold in the same period. It was the film's UK distributor Manga Entertainment's second-best selling anime release of 2011. A representative of Manga Entertainment said, "I think [it was] because it was available in Asda and Morrisons, came with a free rare card and was stupidly cheap on [the] shelf". When it was broadcast by TV Tokyo in 2014, the film earned a 0.3 percent television viewership rating.

Andy Haley from UK Anime Network praised the English version and stated it is "arguably preferable even to the original Japanese audio". Haley praised the film "for keeping its focus and plot progression impeccable tight", which made it "an intense, non-stop experience". However, Haley said the film was created to increase the sale of cards; he commented it has "plot holes that even kids will see through as it serves only to bring its three characters together at one time and nothing more". Writing for The Guardian, Phelim O'Neill affirmed it has "a very limited style of animation" and that it may be exciting for children but for anyone over ten, "it'll be hard to see this as anything other than a shouty, tacky advert for things you'll never buy". Chris Homer of The Fandom Post praised the film's animation and the matching up of the three protagonists. He criticized it and stated the time travel and the antagonists motives are not well developed, "if at all about why he wants to get rid of what is basically a card game". Total Films Jamie Russell wrote it is difficult for a non-fan of the series to appreciate. Bridget Fox, writing for Neo, also said it is "not for non-fans" but that it is good entertainment with "its frenetic pace, the capable animation, and its refusal to overcomplicate matters".

References

External links

Official Japanese website
2nd Official English trailer & Official English website

2010 films
2010 anime films
2010 3D films
3D animated films
2010s Japanese-language films
2010s fantasy adventure films
2010s children's fantasy films
Animated science fantasy films
Crossover anime and manga
Japanese crossover films
Animated films based on animated series
Anime films based on manga
Gallop (studio)
Japanese 3D films
Animated films about time travel
Anime and manga about time travel